Richard Alston may refer to:

 Richard Alston (choreographer) (born 1948), British choreographer
 Richard Alston (politician) (born 1941), Australian high commissioner to the UK and former Australian senator
 Richard Alston (gridiron football) (born 1980), gridiron football wide receiver and return specialist
 Richard Alston (classicist), professor of Roman history at Royal Holloway, University of London